Reeves and Sons is an English art materials brand and a former manufacturing company established by William Reeves (1739–1803) in 1766. Reeves is credited with having invented the soluble watercolour.

The brand is best known for its "Reeves" brand of artists' acrylic and watercolor paints. The firm went through various name changes during its history, listed as follows:
 Thomas Reeves and Son 1784–1799
 W. J. Reeves 1799–1800
 Reeves and Woodyer 1800–1816
 Reeves, Woodyer and Reeves 1817–1818
 W. J. Reeves and Son 1819–1829
 Reeves and Sons 1830–1890
 Reeves and Sons Ltd 1891–1976

In 1974, the company was acquired by Reckitt and Colman, and then merged with Winsor and Newton, following Reckitt and Colman's acquisition in 1976 of the latter company. In 1991, ownership of the "Reeves" brand was acquired by Wilhelm Becker, through American conglomerate Colart.

References

Visual arts materials
British companies established in 1766
Artists' acrylic paint brands
Watercolor brands
History of the Royal Borough of Kensington and Chelsea